This article lists players who have captained the senior Donegal county football team in the Ulster Senior Football Championship and the All-Ireland Senior Football Championship. Unlike other counties the captain is not chosen from the club that has won the Donegal Senior Football Championship.

Patrick McBrearty has captained the team since 2023.

List of captains

References

 
Donegal